Yu Shentong (born 8 June 1968) is a Chinese former table tennis player who played at the 1992 Summer Olympics.

Table tennis career
He won two World Championship medals; a bronze medal in the men's singles at the 1989 World Table Tennis Championships and a silver medal in the men's team event.

See also
 List of table tennis players
 List of World Table Tennis Championships medalists

References

1968 births
Living people
Table tennis players from Shaanxi
Sportspeople from Xi'an
Chinese male table tennis players
Table tennis players at the 1992 Summer Olympics
Olympic table tennis players of China
World Table Tennis Championships medalists
20th-century Chinese people
21st-century Chinese people